Butterfield Lake is a lake located by Redwood, New York. Water from adjacent Mud Lake flows into Butterfield Lake. Fish species present in the lake are largemouth bass, smallmouth bass, northern pike, walleye, yellow perch, black bullhead, bluegill, and black crappie, bowfin (ling), and possibly still some gar.

For years the lake was home to the Brian Hungerford Water Ski Gala.  Hungerford regaled the residents and their guests with broad skiing expertise from slalom skiing to kneeboarding. He also was a three time winner of the Arbor Trophy awarded annually to the best largemouth bass angler on the lake.

References 

Lakes of New York (state)
Lakes of Jefferson County, New York